Rilke Songs is a composition for mezzo-soprano and piano by the American composer Peter Lieberson.  The work is set to poetry by the Bohemian-Austrian writer Rainer Maria Rilke.  It was composed for Lieberson's wife Lorraine Hunt Lieberson, who gave the world premiere in Santa Fe, New Mexico on July 18, 2001.  The piece was a finalist for the 2002 Pulitzer Prize for Music.

Composition

Background
Peter Lieberson was first exposed to the writing of Rainer Maria Rilke as child, recalling in the score program notes, "When I was growing up, my mother, whose first language was German, would often quote lines from Rilke. I have been drawn to his poetry ever since."  Lieberson composed the songs specifically for his wife Lorraine Hunt Lieberson, remarking of Rilke's poetry:

Structure
Rilke Songs has a duration of roughly 18 minutes and is composed in five movements:
O ihr Zärtlichen
Atmen, du unsichtbares Gedicht!
Wolle die Wandlung
Blumenmuskel, der der Anemone
Stiller Freund

Reception
Reviewing a 2005 recording of the piece, Vivien Schweitzer of The New York Times wrote, "[Lieberson's] Rilke Songs, written for his wife, are intensely communicative works, combining atonality and tonality in the vivid piano part."  She added, "Mr. Lieberson writes that he thinks of these pieces as 'love songs,' even though the poems are not specifically about love. Ms. Hunt Lieberson's radiant voice is expressive throughout her range, with its bright top notes, smoky lower register and elegant vibrato."

References

Compositions by Peter Lieberson
2001 compositions
Classical song cycles in English
Musical settings of poems by Rainer Maria Rilke